This is a list of films produced in Albania during the 1960s.

Films 

  (1961)
  (1963)
  (1964)
  (1965)
  (1966)
  (1966)
  (1967)
  (1967)
  (1968)
  (1968)
  (1968)
  (1969)
  (1969)
  (1969)
  (1969)

References 

Lists of Albanian films